Joana de Verona (born 8 December 1989) is a Brazilian-Portuguese actress. She has appeared in more than forty films and series since 2001.

She graduated with an MFA in Theater from the Lisbon Theatre and Film School. She has worked with theater directors such as Carlos Avillez, Luis Miguel Cintra, Gonçalo Amorim, Marco Martins, Monica Garnel, Monica Calle. She works in countries such as Brazil, France, Portugal, Germany and Italy.

Selected filmography

References

External links 

1989 births
Living people
Portuguese film actresses
Lisbon Theatre and Film School alumni